Tearce (Albanian:Tearcë) is a municipality in northwestern North Macedonia. Tearce is also the name of the village where the municipal seat is found. Tearce Municipality is part of the Polog Statistical Region.

Geography
The municipality borders Kosovo to the north, Jegunovce Municipality to the east and south, and Tetovo Municipality to the west.

Demographics
According to the 2021 Macedonian census, this municipality has 17,694 inhabitants. Ethnic groups in the municipality:

References

 
Polog Statistical Region
Municipalities of North Macedonia